Airfer Paramotores (formally Paramotores Air-Future, S.L.) is a Spanish aircraft manufacturer once based in Pontevedra and more recently in Socuéllamos in the Province of Ciudad Real. The company specializes in the design and manufacture of paramotors and powered parachutes in the form of ready-to-fly aircraft for the US FAR 103 Ultralight Vehicles rules and the European Fédération Aéronautique Internationale microlight category.

Airfer has produced a line of paramotors that make use of titanium frames to save weight in increase durability. Older models no longer in production include the Airfer Bimax, Titan and Tornado. The current production paramotor is the Airfer Explorer series.

The company also produces powered parachutes, including the now out-of-production Airfer Transan. Current powered parachute designs include the Trike C1, Trike C1 Sport, Rumbo 250, Diamond Thor 250, Yumbo and the Mustang.

Aircraft

References

External links

Aircraft manufacturers of Spain
Ultralight aircraft
Powered parachutes
Paramotors